Prince or Clown (German: Fürst oder Clown) is a 1928 German silent film directed by Aleksandr Razumny and starring Marcella Albani, Barbara von Annenkoff and Iván Petrovich.

Cast
 Marcella Albani as Lydia  
Barbara von Annenkoff as Fürstin Endoxia  
 Iván Petrovich as Lucien Tréma  
 Ralph Arthur Roberts as Prinz Hektor  
 Oskar Homolka as Zurube  
 Hermann Picha as Saccabona  
 Michael Mar as Ygdal  
 Lilian Weiß as Midinette 
 Sig Arno as Sapigneul

References

Bibliography
 Bock, Hans-Michael & Bergfelder, Tim. The Concise CineGraph. Encyclopedia of German Cinema. Berghahn Books, 2009.

External links

1928 films
Films of the Weimar Republic
Films directed by Aleksandr Razumnyj
German silent feature films
Films with screenplays by Franz Schulz
Films based on French novels
German black-and-white films
Phoebus Film films